Albert Delpy (born 13 September 1941) is a Vietnamese-born French actor and writer. He has appeared in more than one hundred films since 1970.

Personal life
He is the father of Julie Delpy and has appeared as her on-screen father in 2 Days in Paris and 2 Days in New York as well as her TV series On The Verge.

Theater

Filmography

References

External links 

1941 births
Living people
French male film actors
People from Ho Chi Minh City